CUDOS may refer to:

 Centre for Ultrahigh Bandwidth Devices for Optical Systems
Mertonian norms, principles of modern science in Robert K. Merton's 1973 work The Normative Structure of Science from which were later derived the 'CUDOS' principles (the definition varies between sources: these are either the original 4 rearranged to make a mnemonic, or 5 with the addition of 'originality' and shortening of 'organized scepticism' to 'scepticism').